For the theoretical and practical problem-solving subfield of Management, see Management Science.

Management Science is a peer-reviewed academic journal that covers research on all aspects of management related to strategy, entrepreneurship, innovation, information technology, and organizations as well as all functional areas of business, such as accounting, finance, marketing, and operations. It is published by the Institute for Operations Research and the Management Sciences and was established in 1954 by the institute's precursor, the Institute of Management Sciences. C. West Churchman was the founding editor-in-chief.

According to the Journal Citation Reports, the journal has a 2018 impact factor of 4.219.

Editors-in-chief 
The following persons are, or have been, editors-in-chief:
2018–2020: David Simchi-Levi
2014–2018: Teck-Hua Ho
2009–2014: Gérard Cachon
2003–2008: Wallace Hopp
1997–2002: Hau L. Lee
1993–1997: Gabriel R. Bitran
1983–1990: Donald G. Morrison
1968–1983: Martin K. Starr
1960–1967: Robert M. Thrall
1954–1960: C. West Churchman

Notable papers
According to Google Scholar, the following three papers have been cited most frequently:

References

External links

Business and management journals
Publications established in 1954
Management science
Monthly journals
English-language journals
INFORMS academic journals